The wards of Brighton and Hove are administrative wards of the unitary authority of Brighton and Hove, England. There are 21 wards represented by 54 councillors as of 12 October 2022. These 54 councillors make up the Brighton and Hove City Council.

Wards

References 

Brighton and Hove City Council